The following are the national records in track cycling in Trinidad and Tobago maintained by the Trinidad and Tobago Cycling Federation.

Men

Women

References

External links
 Trinidad and Tobago Cycling Federation website
 Trinidad and Tobago Records (Updated 03.09.2017)

Trinidad
Records
Track cycling
track cycling